"Dreamer Deceiver" is a power ballad by English heavy metal band Judas Priest, featured on their 1976 studio album Sad Wings of Destiny. Unlike other songs on the album, the song is a "spacey ballad." The song is known for showing off Rob Halford's full vocal range, starting from soft, quiet singing, to high pitched shrieking. It was performed by the band on the British television programme The Old Grey Whistle Test in 1975.

The 2-part medley was released as a single in Japan in 1976 calling the first song "I – Dreamer Deceiver" and the second song "II – Deceiver".

The lyrics describe a mystical figure who takes the narrator up through the sky. He ends up "lost above", but is "in peace of mind". He then instructs the listener to try to find a way. The guitar solo is played by Glenn Tipton. This song segues into the next song, "Deceiver", via a long, high pitched scream by Halford.

Personnel
Rob Halford – lead vocals
K. K. Downing – guitar
Glenn Tipton – guitar, piano
Ian Hill – bass
Alan Moore – drums

References

Judas Priest songs
1976 songs
Songs written by Rob Halford
Songs written by K. K. Downing
Songs written by Glenn Tipton
1970s ballads
British progressive rock songs
Space rock songs
Rock ballads